Andriy Marchuk (born 25 June 1997) is a professional Ukrainian football goalkeeper who plays for the amateur Ukrainian club Kulykiv.

Career
Marchuk is a product of Youth Sportive School #4 in his native Lviv and FC Volyn youth sportive systems.

He spent his career in the Ukrainian Premier League Reserves club FC Volyn Lutsk. And in summer 2016 Marchuk was promoted to the main-squad team of the FC Volyn in the Ukrainian Premier League. He made his debut for Volyn Lutsk in the Ukrainian Premier League in a match against FC Zorya Luhansk on 15 October 2016.

References

External links 
 
 

1997 births
Living people
Sportspeople from Lviv
Ukrainian footballers
Association football goalkeepers
Ukrainian Premier League players
Ukrainian First League players
FC Volyn Lutsk players